Leaves are one of the four suits in German-suited packs of playing cards. This suit was invented in 15th century Germany and is a survivor from a large pool of experimental suit signs created to replace the Latin suits. Around 1480, French card makers adapted this sign into Spades in the French pack (known as pikes in France).

As its name suggests, the leaf is represented by a stylized green leaf. The left half is lighter than the right half; it can sometimes be yellow. Veins are visible and there is usually a petiole. There may also be smaller leaves.

They are usually known in German as Laub ("foliage"), but also as Gras ("grass"), Blatt ("leaf") or Grün ("green"). Cards are referred to as in a French pack e.g. the "King of Leaves", but in German as "Laub-König" or "Grün-König" i.e. "Leaf King". It is the second-highest suit in the games of Skat, Schafkopf and Doppelkopf, and the second lowest in Préférence.

The gallery below shows a suit of Leaves from a German suited deck of 32 cards. The pack is of the Saxonian pattern:

See also 
 German playing cards
 Suit (cards)

References 

Card suits